Henry Mayer Halff (1874-1934) was an American rancher, horse breeder and polo player.

Early life
Henry Mayer Halff was born on August 17, 1874 in San Antonio, Texas. His father, Mayer Halff, was a French immigrant who became a large rancher in Texas. His mother was Rachel Hart.

Halff was educated at the Staunton Military Academy, a male-only military boarding school in Staunton, Virginia. He graduated from Eastman Business College, a business school in Poughkeepsie, New York.

Halff served in the Spanish–American War.

Career
Halff moved to Midland, Texas to embark upon a career in ranching in 1904. He ranched in Midland County, Crane County, Crockett County and Upton County. He inherited the Quien Sabe Ranch in Midland County and the JM Ranch in Upton County from his father. He raised Hereford cattle and grew honeydew melon.

Halff was the owner of the H.M. Halff Polo Farm, a polo and horsebreeder farm in Midland, Texas. He bred Belgian stallions with draft horses. He also bred Thoroughbreds with mares to produce polo ponies.

Halff was the owner of a real estate business in Midland. When he moved to Mineral Wells, Texas in 1925, he ran a real estate business there. When he moved to Dallas in 1929, he ran a real estate business there as well. Halff served as the president of the West Texas Chamber of Commerce.

Halff was a member of the Rotary Club.

Personal life
Halff married Rosa Wechsler in 1905. They had two sons and two daughters. He retired to a farm in Richardson, Texas in 1931.

Death
Halff died on March 20, 1934 in Richardson, Texas. His funeral was held at Temple Emanu-El. He was buried at the Emanu-El Cemetery in Dallas, Texas.

References

1874 births
1934 deaths
American people of French-Jewish descent
People from San Antonio
People from Midland, Texas
People from Dallas
People from Richardson, Texas
American military personnel of the Spanish–American War
Ranchers from Texas
Horse breeders
American polo players
Jewish American military personnel